Pitcairnia maidifolia is a plant species in the genus Pitcairnia. This species is native to Central America (Honduras, El Salvador, Nicaragua, Panama, Costa Rica) and northern South America (Guyana, Suriname, Venezuela, Colombia and Ecuador).

Cultivars
 Pitcairnia 'Jim Scrivner'
 Pitcairnia 'Stardust'
 Pitcairnia 'Verdia Lowe'

References

maidifolia
Flora of Central America
Flora of South America
Plants described in 1849